Mary Meyer may refer to:

 Mary Pinchot Meyer (1920–1964), American murder victim, wife of CIA official Cord Meyer
 Mary Meyer Corporation, stuffed animal and toy company in Vermont
 Mary Jones Meyer, poker player
 Mary C. Meyer, American statistician

Meyer, Mary